Snafuperman is a 1944 animated short comedy produced by Warner Bros. and directed by Friz Freleng. It is one of a series of black and white "Private Snafu" cartoons created for the Army-Navy Screen Magazine and shown only to American soldiers. The "Private Snafu" cartoons were not released commercially, until December 2010. The cartoon's title is a play on "Superman" and parodies the popular Superman cartoons of the 1940s.

Synopsis
Snafu annoys his fellow soldiers by listening to loud swing music and banging pots and pans in rhythm. The other soldiers at the barracks are busy studying maps, field manuals, and air recognition charts. Snafu dismisses their interest in studying, and claims he is not going to clunk the enemy over the head with books. In response, Technical Fairy, First Class—a miniature, shirtless, gravel-voiced G.I. with wings, who appears in nine of the shorts—grants Private Snafu the powers of Superman in order to fight the Nazis. But Snafu is still Snafu.

His first task is to transport a bomb to Berlin and bomb it. He refuses to read a map and ends up in Washington, D.C. He drops the bomb over the United States Capitol. The Fairy stops the bomb and informs Snafu that the Americans are on their side, and Snafu melts into a puddle in the air in embarrassment over his near blunder. His next task involves stopping a "lumbering Japanese tank". He has actually misidentified an American tank and angers its commander, an American general. He nervously salutes the officer.

He next spots "a mess of Messerschmitts" about to bomb an American port. He successfully intercepts their aerial bombs and piles them up on a pier. As he proudly sits upon the pile, while claiming that they're harmless as a burned out match, he fails to recognize the delay-action bombs among them. They explode beneath him. As a result of his own ignorance, Snafu ends up hospitalized. The Fairy visits him, asking if there is anything he could do. Snafu angrily demands a field manual, ending the short.

Analysis
The short is one of several satirical takes on Superman produced during World War II. The purpose of the short was to entertain and educate low-literacy enlisted men. Snafu ends up doing the wrong thing because of his refusal to read his field manual.

The short uses a segment of Sammy Timberg's theme for Superman, which was previously heard in the Superman shorts by Fleischer Studios and Famous Studios. Stalling was able to use the song without any legal issues since the Private Snafu shorts were meant exclusively to educate US soldiers and not for public viewing.

Availability
The "Private Snafu" cartoons have fallen into the public domain and are widely available in free downloads and on unofficial VHS and DVD releases. Many have also been released officially. Snafuperman is a bonus feature on Warner Home Video's Looney Tunes Golden Collection: Volume 3 and Superman Ultimate Collector's Edition. (Coincidentally, Warner Bros. and Superman's publishers, DC Comics, merged in 1969, which made the cartoon's inclusion in the latter set possible.)

See also
 List of Private Snafu shorts
 Sponsored film
 List of films in the public domain in the United States

Sources

References

References
Leonard Maltin, Of Mice and Magic: A History of American Animated Cartoons, NY, 1987, p. 254

External links
 
 

1944 films
1940s parody films
1944 animated films
1940s animated superhero films
American animated comedy films
American animated superhero films
American animated science fiction films
American black-and-white films
1940s English-language films
Parody superheroes
American superhero comedy films
Private Snafu
Short films directed by Friz Freleng
Films set in Washington, D.C.
Articles containing video clips
Films scored by Carl Stalling
American parody films
Films produced by Leon Schlesinger
1944 comedy films
1940s Warner Bros. animated short films
1940s American films